The Cardiff Deanery is a Roman Catholic deanery in the Archdiocese of Cardiff that oversees several churches in the city of Cardiff. It replaced the previous Cardiff East Deanery and Cardiff West Deanery, combining the two into one. The dean is centred at the Parish of St Mary's Canton.

Churches
The parishes in the deanery have been split into 'clusters'. These churches are not being merged but will be working together to make sure that all parishioners in the cluster are served sufficiently. As part of the archdiocese reorganisations, various churches were put into the same parish.

 Blessed Sacrament, Rumney
 St Cadoc, Llanrumney
 St John Lloyd, Trowbridge

 St Alban on the Moors, Splott - served by the Cardiff Oratory
 St Joseph, Gabalfa - served by the Rosminians
 St Peter, Roath - served by the Rosminians

 St Brigid, Llanishen
 St Paul, Cyncoed - served from St Brigid
 Christ the King, Llanishen - served from St Brigid

 St Philip Evans, Llanedeyrn
 St Teilo, Whitchurch
 Our Lady of Lourdes, Gabalfa - served from Whitchurch

 St Mary of the Angels, Canton
 Sacred Heart, Leckwith - served from Canton
 Holy Family, Fairwater - served from Canton

 St Patrick, Grangetown
 St Cuthbert, Cardiff Docks - utilised by the Ukrainian Greek Catholic Church Parish of St Theodore of Tarsus
 St Francis of Assisi, Ely
 St Clare, Ely - served from St Francis of Assisi Church

 St David's Metropolitan Cathedral, Cardiff City Centre
 University Chaplaincy, Cardiff City Centre

 St Helen, Barry
 St Joseph, Penarth
 St Mary, Dinas Powys - served from Penarth

Gallery

References

External links
 Archdiocese of Cardiff site
 Cardiff Metropolitan Cathedral site
 St Cadoc's Parish site
 St Alban's Parish site
 St Joseph's Parish site
 St Peter's Parish site
 Ss Brigid and Paul Parish site
 St Philip Evans Parish site
 St Teilo and Our Lady of Lourdes Parish site
 St Mary of the Angels Parish site
 St Helen Parish site

Roman Catholic Deaneries in the Archdiocese of Cardiff